The 2nd Ukrainian Front (2-й Украинский фронт), was a front of the Red Army during the Second World War.

History 
On October 20, 1943, the Steppe Front was renamed the 2nd Ukrainian Front.

During the Second Jassy–Kishinev Offensive, 2nd Ukrainian Front, led by Army General Rodion Malinovsky, comprised:

 6th Guards Tank Army – Major General A.G. Kravchenko
 4th Guards Army – Ivan Galanin
 7th Guards Army – Lieutenant General M.S. Shumilov
 27th Army – Lieutenant General S.G. Trofimenko
 40th Army – Lieutenant General Filipp Zhmachenko
 52nd Army – Lieutenant General K.A. Koroteev
 53rd Army – Lieutenant General Ivan Managarov
 18th Tank Corps – Major General V.I. Polozkov
 Cavalry-Mechanized Group Gorshkov – Major General Sergey Gorshkov
5th Guards Cavalry Corps
 23rd Tank Corps – Lieutenant General Alexey Akhmanov

On 1 January 1945, during the Siege of Budapest, the Front consisted of the 
 7th Guards Army, 
 27th Army 
 40th Army 
 53rd Army 
 6th Guards Tank Army, 
 a Cavalry mechanized group consisting of 4th and 6th Guards Cavalry Corps, 
 5th Air Army.

On 10 June 1945, in accordance with a Stavka directive of 29 May 1945, the 2nd Ukrainian Front was disbanded. Elements thereof were incorporated into Headquarters Odessa Military District.

The 12th Air Defence Corps (12 корпус ПВО), established from the Odessa Corps Air Defence Area (Одесский корпусной район ПВО) on 21.04.1944,  provided air defence to the 2nd Ukrainian Front until 01.02.1945, except for its 61st AAA Division (1776, 1778, 1780, 1782 and 1784 AAA regiments and the 6th AA Lighting Regiment), which provided air defence to the 1st Ukrainian Front.

Commanders  
 Army General Ivan Konev (July 1943 – May 1944; since February 1944 Marshal of the Soviet Union)
 Army General Rodion Malinovsky (May 1944 – May 1945; since September 1944 Marshal of the Soviet Union)

See also 
Combat composition of the Soviet Army

References 

U
Military units and formations established in 1943